"Cha-Ching" is a song by Canadian pop rock group Hedley. It was released to radio on August 17, 2009 as the lead single from the band's third studio album The Show Must Go. The song entered the Canadian Hot 100 at number 34, and ended up reaching the top ten at number six. It is about reality television shows being fabricated, and references several TV shows and stars.

Performances
On February 28, 2010, Hedley performed the song at the Closing Ceremonies of the 2010 Winter Olympics in Vancouver, with altered lyrics referencing the 2010 Winter Olympics, as well as the 2014 Winter Olympics. The band also performed the song during their halftime performance at the 2013 Grey Cup game.

Music video
The music video was filmed on August 24, 2009 in Liberty Village, Toronto. The video was released September 17, 2009, premiering on MuchMusic. In the video, the band is shown performing, as well as mocking the TV shows and celebrities referenced in the song.

Cultural references
The Real World
American Idol/Canadian Idol
The Biggest Loser
Survivor
Kim Kardashian
Tila Tequila
Flavor Flav
Verne Troyer/Mini Me
The Hills
MTV
TMZ
Playboy

Awards and nominations

Charts

Weekly charts

Year-end charts

References

2009 singles
2009 songs
Hedley (band) songs
Reality television series parodies
Songs written by Brian Howes
Universal Music Group singles